Sokar is a town and union council of Dera Ghazi Khan District in the Punjab province of Pakistan. The town is part of Taunsa Tehsil. It is located at 30°38'60N 70°35'60E and has an altitude of 176 metres (580 feet). The town was established by Mir Chakar Khan Rind after he captured Sanghar pass. The town was named after one of warriors of Mir Chakar Khan Rind named Malagh Khan Rind whose sword weighed 75 kg and nobody except Malagh Khan Rind was able to fight with that sword. Malgahni Baloch tribe is actually generation of Malagh Khan Rind.

References

Populated places in Dera Ghazi Khan District
Union councils of Dera Ghazi Khan District
Cities and towns in Punjab, Pakistan